M85 is a fuel blending 85% methanol and 15% petrol. M85 is similar to E85, but cannot be used in vehicles designed for E85. Although it is similar in composition, M85 isn't as well known as its ethanol counterpart. Despite these issues, methanol is considered a viable alternative fuel as it contains high levels of hydrogen.

References

Liquid fuels